Runner is a 2012 studio album by The Sea and Cake, released on Thrill Jockey.

Track listing

Personnel
 Sam Prekop – vocals, guitar, synthesizer
 Archer Prewitt – guitar, organ
 Eric Claridge – bass guitar
 John McEntire – drums, keyboards, percussion
 Heba Kadry – mastering

Charts

References

External links
 
 Runner at Thrill Jockey

2012 albums
The Sea and Cake albums
Thrill Jockey albums